Delivering the Black is the tenth studio album from German heavy metal band Primal Fear, which was released on 24 January 2014 via Frontiers Records.

Music videos were made for "When Death Comes Knocking", "King for a Day" and "Alive & on Fire".

Track listing 

Note
 Limited Edition releases contains a DVD featuring two music videos and the making of the album

Charts

Personnel
Ralf Scheepers - Vocals
Mat Sinner - Bass, vocals
Magnus Karlsson - Guitars, keyboards
Alex Beyrodt - Guitars
Randy Black - Drums

Additional Musicians
Liv Kristine - Backing vocals on "Born with a Broken Heart"

Production
Mat Sinner - Producer, Lyrics
Achim Koehler - Recording
Jacob Hansen - Mixing, Mastering
Ralf Scheepers - Co-producer (vocals), Lyrics
Magnus Karlsson - Co-producer, Lyrics
Oliver Barth - Filming (Bonus DVD)
Sinja Mueller - Recording (assistant)
Jobert Mello - Cover art, Artwork, Layout
Alex Kuehr - Photography

References

2014 albums
Frontiers Records albums
Primal Fear (band) albums